Sleep Through the Static is the fourth studio album by singer-songwriter Jack Johnson, released in the United States on February 5, 2008. The album was announced on Johnson's website as renovation began for the release of the album. It was recorded at the Los Angeles Solar Powered Plastic Plant, which makes it Johnson's first album made outside of Hawaii. It was produced by JP Plunier.

The album was played live for the first time at the BBC in December for a select number of fans. Despite having been reviewed mostly unenthusiastically by professional music critics, worldwide sales of the album were on par with Johnson's previous albums.

The first single, "If I Had Eyes", was released via Johnson's MySpace page on December 11, 2007. The second single from the album was "Hope" and was released on September, peaking at number No. 30 on the Billboard Modern Rock Tracks.

The album debuted at number one on the US Billboard 200 chart, selling about 375,000 copies in its first week, including 139,000 digital downloads. This was a record high for weekly digital album sales. It also debuted at number one on the Worldwide chart with sales of 577,000. It held the record at iTunes for most digital downloads in a single day, until Coldplay's Viva la Vida or Death and All His Friends set a new record.

Sleep Through the Static remained at number one on the Billboard 200 in its second week of release, by which time it had sold over 180,000 copies, as well as its third week, in which it sold 105,000 copies. It fell from the number one spot in its fourth week, in which it placed third with about 92,000 copies sold. The album was made #45 in Q'''s 50 Best Albums of the Year 2008.

Track listing
All songs written by Jack Johnson, except where noted.
 "All at Once" – 3:38
 "Sleep Through the Static" – 3:43
 "Hope" (Jack Johnson, Zach Rogue) – 3:42
 "Angel" – 2:02
 "Enemy" – 3:48
 "If I Had Eyes" – 3:59
 "Same Girl" – 2:10
 "What You Thought You Need" – 5:27
 "Adrift" – 3:56
 "Go On" – 4:35
 "They Do, They Don't" – 4:10
 "While We Wait" – 1:26
 "Monsoon" (Jack Johnson, Merlo Podlewski) – 4:17
 "Losing Keys" – 4:28
 "Home" (acoustic; bonus track on some versions e.g. Australian release) – 3:30

Personnel
Jack Johnson – vocals and guitar
Adam Topol – drums
Merlo Podlewski – bass
Madison Young – flute and tambourine
Zach Gill – keys and vocals
Danny Riley – backup vocals on "If I Had Eyes"
JP Plunier – backup vocals and claps on "If I Had Eyes"
Emmett Malloy and Josh Arroyo – hand claps on "If I Had Eyes"
Trent Johnson – acoustic guitar on "Go On"

Charts

Weekly charts

Year-end charts

Certifications and sales

RemixSleep Through the Static: Remixed is a 2008 remix album of songs from Sleep Through the Static''. The release features video tracks as well as eight new tracks.

Audio
"Hope" (Nightmares on Wax Remix)
"Losing Keys" (Katalyst Remix)
"Monsoon" (Money Mark Casio Remix)
"Angel" (Kid Koala Remix)
"They Do, They Don't" (DJ Tropikal Remix)
"Hope" (Mario C. Remix)
"If I Had Eyes" (Culver City Dub Collective Remix)
"Enemy" (Worst Friends Remix)

Video
"Adrift" (live studio session)
"Enemy" (live studio session)
"Sleep Through the Static/I Love You and Buddha Too" (live studio sessions)

References

External links
 Johnson's site on the remix album

2008 albums
Jack Johnson (musician) albums
Brushfire Records albums
Universal Music Group albums